The scudo (plural scudi) is the official currency of the Sovereign Military Order of Malta and was the currency of Malta during the rule of the Order over Malta, which ended in 1798. It is subdivided into  12 tarì (singular tarì), each of 20 grani (singular grano) with 6 piccoli (singular piccolo) to the grano. It is pegged to the euro (at a rate of 1 scudo to €0.24, which translates to €1 = 4 scudi 2 tarì).

History
The scudo was first minted in Rhodes in 1318. By 1500 the coins had the distinctive characteristics of a cross and the Order's and Grandmaster's coat of arms on one side, and the head of St. John the Baptist on the other. The scudo was first minted in Malta during the reign of Piero de Ponte. The quality of the coins improved especially during the reign of António Manoel de Vilhena in the early 18th century. At some points in time, foreign coinage was allowed to circulate in Malta alongside the scudo. These included Spanish dollars, Venetian lira, Louis d'or and other currencies.

During the French occupation of Malta in 1798, the French authorities melted down some of the silver from the island's churches and struck them into 15 and 30 tarì coins from the 1798 dies of Grandmaster Hompesch. After the Maltese rebellion, gold and silver ingots were stamped with a face value in grani, tarì and scudi and they briefly circulated as coinage in Valletta and the surrounding area.

The scudo continued to circulate on the island of Malta, which had become a British colony, along with some other currencies until they were all replaced by the pound in 1825, at a rate of 1 pound to 12 scudi using British coinage. Despite this, some scudi remained in use and the last coins were withdrawn from circulation and demonetized in November 1886. 1 scudo in 1886 had the spending power equivalent to £3.82 or €4.35 in 2011. The present-day Republic of Malta adopted the decimal Maltese pound in 1972, and the euro in 2008.

The SMOM, which is now based in Rome, has issued souvenir coins denominated in grani, tarì and scudi since 1961. The 1961 issues were minted in Rome, while mints in Paris and Arezzo were used in 1962 and 1963. From 1964 onwards coins were minted in the Order's own mint.

The scudo was also the currency used on the Order's stamps from 1961 to 2005, when the euro began to be used.

Coins

Coins were issued in denominations of 1, 5 and 10 grani, 1, 2, 4 and 6 tarì, 1, 2, 5, 10 and 20 scudi. The 1, 5 and 10 grani and 1 tarì were minted in copper, with the  grani denominated as 15 piccoli. The 5, 10, 20 scudi coins were gold.

Coins minted today include bronze 10 grani, silver 9 tarì, 1 and 2 scudi and gold 5 and 10 scudi.

In 2011, a gold coin of António Manoel de Vilhena minted in 1725 sold for US$340,000.

References

Currencies of Europe
Currencies of Malta
Escudo